Sophie Jane Edington (born 12 December 1984) is an Australian backstroke and freestyle swimmer.

Biography
Edington trained at the Kingscliff ASC club under Greg Salter.  After Salter took up an overseas coaching role Edington moved to Queensland to train under the QAS program from the end of 2008.  In 2010, she moved to Melbourne where she trained at MSAC.  At the 2005 World Aquatics Championships in Montréal she won two gold medals, with the backstroke leg in 4×100-metre medley relay, and as a heat swimmer in the 4×100-metre freestyle relay.  She won three gold medals at the 2006 Commonwealth Games in Melbourne: 50-metre and 100-metre backstroke, and the 4×100-metre medley relay in world record time of 3:56.30 seconds with teammates Leisel Jones, Libby Lenton and Jessicah Schipper. Edington set a new world record for the 50-metre backstroke at the 2008 Australian Olympic Trials. She was part of the relay team in 2004 that broke the World Record at the world short course championships.  Four years after winning three gold medals at the Melbourne Commonwealth Games, Edington was successful in defending the 50m backstroke title to claim her fourth Commonwealth gold medal at Delhi in 2010.

After narrowly missing the 2012 Olympic team, Edington competed in the European summer circuit prior to working with Channel 7 News during the London Games.  Continuing in the sports world, Edington moved to Switzerland and worked at the International Olympic Committee until the end of 2014. Edington now works for The Cambridge Strategy (Asset Management) and resides in Monaco.

Edington is pursuing a Doctorate of Business Administration at the International School of Management in Paris.

See also
 List of World Aquatics Championships medalists in swimming (women)
 List of Commonwealth Games medallists in swimming (women)
 Commonwealth Games records in swimming
 World record progression 50 metres backstroke
 World record progression 4 × 100 metres medley relay

References

External links
 

1984 births
Living people
People from Loxton, South Australia
Commonwealth Games gold medallists for Australia
Swimmers at the 2006 Commonwealth Games
World record setters in swimming
Olympic swimmers of Australia
Swimmers at the 2008 Summer Olympics
People educated at Pembroke School, Adelaide
Australian female backstroke swimmers
Australian female freestyle swimmers
World Aquatics Championships medalists in swimming
Medalists at the FINA World Swimming Championships (25 m)
Commonwealth Games medallists in swimming
21st-century Australian women
Medallists at the 2006 Commonwealth Games